

Table

2009 Fixtures and results

Whitehaven RLFC season
Whitehaven R.L.F.C.
English rugby league club seasons